Born to Battle is a 1935 American Western film produced by Bernard B. Ray and Harry S. Webb and directed by Webb for Reliable Pictures.

Plot 
"Cyclone" Tom Saunders, a free-spirited cowboy, is hired by a ranchers' association to look into a series of cattle thefts, for which they suspect a pair of "nesters". When Saunders discovers that the nesters are an old man and his pretty young daughter and could not be the rustlers, he begins to suspect that Nate Lenox, a bullying ranch foreman, might have something to do with it.

Cast 
Tom Tyler as "Cyclone" Tom Saunders
Jean Carmen as Betty Powell
Earl Dwire as George Powell
Julian Rivero as Pablo Carranza
Nelson McDowell as Lem "Blinky" Holt
William Desmond as John Brownell
Richard Alexander as Nate Lenox
Charles King as Jim Larmer
Ralph Lewis as Justice Hiram McClump
Ben Corbett as Deputy

External links 

1935 films
1935 Western (genre) films
American black-and-white films
American Western (genre) films
Reliable Pictures films
Films directed by Harry S. Webb
1930s English-language films
1930s American films